Karfaleh-ye Lavan (also Romanized as Kerfeleh-ye Lāvan; also known as Kerfeleh-ye Lāvand and Karfaleh) is a village in Shurab Rural District, Veysian District, Dowreh County, Lorestan Province, Iran. At the 2006 census, its population was 108, in 27 families.

References 

Towns and villages in Dowreh County